Identity Disc is a 2004 five-part comic book limited series published by Marvel Comics. The story was written by Robert Rodi and penciled by John Higgins.

In the story, six Marvel villains "team up" to steal the Identity Disc, which supposedly contains data on every Marvel hero, including their relatives and credit reports. The plot is largely inspired by the film The Usual Suspects.

Synopsis
The story opens with a younger Adrian Toomes, pre-Vulture, being captured by police as his wife takes his daughter from him. Years later, Deadpool, Bullseye, Juggernaut, Sandman, the Vulture, and Sabretooth are recruited by an agent working for underworld figure Tristram Silver, who knows a dark secret for each supervillain, (although at the time Juggernaut and, arguably, Deadpool, were not villains). The agent demonstrates that she can take any one of them down by killing the Sandman. She wants them to hunt down the Identity Disc, which contains every piece of information on Marvel's Earthbound superheroes.

The remaining villains break into A.I.M headquarters to steal it.  Deadpool separates from the rest of the group to draw off the assaulting A.I.M. agents (due to his advanced healing factor).  Sabretooth descends down an elevator shaft only to be accidentally crushed by a plummeting Juggernaut (who was in turn tripped by Bullseye) as the two argued who would make a last stand against the advancing A.I.M. forces at the mouth of the shaft.  The invulnerable Juggernaut locates the identity disc only to be gassed into unconsciousness by an unseen assailant.  The A.I.M. lair collapses and the Vulture is taken into custody by S.H.I.E.L.D.

Nick Fury informs Toomes that Sabretooth (whose secret was never revealed), was responsible for the set-up.  In the twist ending of the book, however, it is revealed that Silver's agent is not only actually an agent of S.H.I.E.L.D., but Vulture's daughter, Valeria Toomes, now an adult.  Toomes scoffs at the notion that he wouldn't recognize his own daughter and privately concedes to having been responsible for the entire plan, in order to protect her identity (which was also on the disc).  As she leads him to be taken away in a S.H.I.E.L.D. chopper, she secretly instructs him to fall so that she can pick him up.  The two share a secret, tender embrace—father and daughter reunited.

Meanwhile, Sandman is revealed to be alive and enjoying a tropical vacation, having faked his own death at the behest of his real employer—the real Tristram Silver.

Collected editions
Identity Disc was published collectively as a 120-page trade paperback, .

References

 
 

2004 comics debuts
2004 comics endings